The 1963 Open Championship was held at the Lansdowne Club in London from 26 November - 5 December 1962.
Azam Khan was unable to defend his title after struggling to regain fitness following an Achilles tendon injury. Mo Khan won the Open Championship defeating Abdelfattah Abou Taleb in the final. Incredibly Taleb had led the final two sets to one and eight points to one needing just one more point to become champion. Mo Khan however recovered to win the set and then the match in a remarkable comeback. Roshan Khan defeated Aftab Jawaid in the third place play off 9-3 9-6 5-9 4-9 9-3.

Seeds

Draw and results

First qualifying round
 John Skinner beat  Terry Pickering 9-0 6-9 3-9 9-0 9-2

 Aftab Jawaid beat  Jonathan Smith 7-9 9-5 8-10 9-7 10-9

 Brian Wise beat  Peter Fuente w/o

 Sherif Afifi beat  Ken Watson 5-9 9-4 9-5 9-3

 Richard Hawkey beat  Don Thompson 9-0 6-9 9-7 6-9 9-3

Second qualifying round
 Tony Gathercole beat  Mike Corby 5-9 9-4 6-9 9-7 9-5

 George Chisholm beat  Richard Hawkey 9-2 9-2 1-9 1-9 10-8

 Sherif Afifi beat  Brian Wise 10-9 7-9 9-6 9-7

 Aly Abdel Aziz beat  Pat Kirton 9-7 4-9 9-2 10-9

 Aftab Jawaid beat  John Skinner

Main draw

+ Corby gained a lucky losers place by virtue of the withdrawal of Yusuf Khan of India.

References

Men's British Open Squash Championships
Men's British Open Championship
Men's British Open Squash Championship
Men's British Open Squash Championship
Men's British Open Squash Championship
Men's British Open Squash Championship
Squash competitions in London